The Naval Justice School (NJS) is an educational institution of the United States Navy whose mission is to instruct Navy, Marine Corps, and Coast Guard officers and enlisted personnel in the fundamental principles of military justice, civil and administrative law, and procedure. In addition to being licensed attorneys in any state or territory of the U.S., all attorneys in the Judge Advocate General's Corps must undergo training either in this institution, or in the complementary institutions of the United States Army and the United States Air Force, allowing them to act as trial or defense counsel at military courts-martial.

The Naval Justice School was founded in 1946 at Port Hueneme, California and moved to Newport, Rhode Island in 1950. It has additional campuses in Norfolk, Virginia and San Diego, California and a branch office in Charlottesville, Virginia. Beginning in 1990, the institution also began instructing U.S. civilians and foreign government officials in human rights law.

Notable alumni
Ivan Abrams, Deputy County Attorney for Mendocino County, California, and long-time international rule-of-law consultant for USAID
Russell A. Anderson, Chief Justice of Minnesota Supreme Court
Duane Benton, Judge of United States Court of Appeals for the Eighth Circuit.
A. Jay Cristol, Judge of the United States Court for the Southern District of Florida
Ron DeSantis, Governor of Florida
John M. Dowd, Special Counsel to MLB, Special Counsel to the Special Counsel investigation
William Benner Enright, Judge of United States District Court for the Southern District of California.
James Knoll Gardner Judge of the United States District Court for the Eastern District of Pennsylvania.
Robert Gammage, Associate Justice of Texas Supreme Court 
Gary Hart, U.S. Senator from Colorado 
Robert Dixon Herman, Judge of the United States District Court for the Middle District of Pennsylvania.
Adam Laxalt, Attorney General of Nevada 
Steven Paul Logan, Judge of the United States District Court for the District of Arizona
James E. McPherson, United States Under Secretary of the Army
Matt Michels, Lieutenant Governor of South Dakota
Kenneth Francis Ripple, Judge of the United States Court of Appeals for the Seventh Circuit.
Mark Salter, Associate Justice of South Dakota Supreme Court
Matthew T. Schelp, Judge of the United States District Court for the Eastern District of Missouri.
Peter G. Strasser, U.S. Attorney for the Eastern District of Louisiana.
Charles Stimson, Deputy Assistant Secretary of Defense for Detainee Affairs
Edward G. Smith, Judge of the United States District Court for the Eastern District of Pennsylvania.
Jay Town, U.S. Attorney for the Northern District of Alabama

Fictional alumni
Daniel Kaffee, Tom Cruise's lead role in A Few Good Men
Harmon Rabb, David James Elliott's lead role in JAG
Bud Roberts, supporting character in JAG
Sturgis Turner, Scott Lawrence's character in JAG
Sarah "Mac" MacKenzie, USMC, Catherine Bell's character in JAG

See also
The Judge Advocate General's Legal Center and School (U.S. Army)
Air Force Judge Advocate General's School
U.S. Navy Judge Advocate General's Corps
U.S. Marine Corps Judge Advocate Division
U.S. Coast Guard Legal Division

References

External links

United States Navy Judge Advocate General's Corps
United States Navy schools and training
United States Marine Corps schools
Military justice
Education in Newport County, Rhode Island
Buildings and structures in Newport, Rhode Island
Educational institutions established in 1946
Military units and formations established in 1946
1946 establishments in Rhode Island